Moualine el Oued is a town in Benslimane Province, Casablanca-Settat, Morocco. According to the 2004 census it has a population of 9,066.

References

Populated places in Benslimane Province